The Copenhagen Marathon is an annual marathon that takes place on the streets of Copenhagen, Denmark. Established in 1980, it is held in May and has around 10,000 participants.  It is a World Athletics Bronze Label race.

The course is a mostly flat loop that begins and ends at the harbourfront of Islands Brygge, and wanders through the municipalities of Copenhagen and Frederiksberg.  There is a time limit of six hours.

The 2020 and 2021 editions of the race were cancelled due to the coronavirus pandemic, with all paying registrants having the option to transfer their entry to the next edition of the race, or to obtain a full refund. The 2022 race is scheduled for May 15.

Winners
Key:

References

External links
 
 Association of Road Racing Statisticians entry

Recurring sporting events established in 1980
Marathons in Denmark
Sports competitions in Copenhagen
Annual events in Copenhagen
May sporting events
Spring (season) events in Denmark
1980 establishments in Denmark